Piperi may refer to:
 Piperi (island), an island in Greece
 Piperi (tribe), a clan in Montenegro
 Piperi, Lopare, a village in the municipality of Lopare, Republika Srpska and in the municipality of Čelić, Federation of Bosnia and Herzegovina, Bosnia and Herzegovina